The 1971 Little All-America college football team is composed of college football players from small colleges and universities who were selected by the Associated Press (AP) as the best players at each position. For 1971, the AP selected three teams, each team having separate offensive and defensive platoons.

First-team quarterback Gary Wichard of C.W. Post was a prolific passer and the son of a New York millionaire.

Terry Metcalf of Long Beach State was a first-team running back in both 1970 and 1971.

Running back Gardy Kahoe was the main offensive weapon for the AP/UPI small college champion 1971 Delaware Fightin' Blue Hens football team. He rushed for 1,216 yards and 23 touchdowns in 10 regular season games. He added another 112 yards in the Boardwalk Bowl.

First team

Offense
 Quarterback - Gary Wichard (senior, 6'2", 217 pounds), C.W. Post
 Running back- Gardy Kahoe (senior, 6'2", 220 pounds), Delaware
 Running back - Bruce Laird (senior, 6'1", 200 pounds), American International
 Running back - Terry Metcalf (junior, 6'0", 185 pounds), Long Beach State
 End - Jerome Barkum (senior, 6'3", 215 pounds), Jackson State
 End - Eldridge Small (senior, 6'1", 190 pounds), Texas A&I
 Tackle - Lionel Antoine (senior, 6'7", 245 pounds), Southern Illinois
 Tackle - Ron Mikolajczyk (junior, 6'3", 270 pounds), Tampa
 Guard - Wayne Dorton (senior, 6'1", 248 pounds), Arkansas State
 Guard - Solomon Freelon (senior, 6'4", 256 pounds), Grambling
 Center - John Hill (senior, 6'2", 230 pounds), Lehigh

Defense
 Defensive end - Kelvin Korver (senior, 6'7", 270 pounds), Northwestern (Iowa)
 Defensive end - John Mendenhall (senior, 6'0", 250 pounds), Grambling
 Defensive tackle - Larry Brooks (senior, 6'3", 265 pounds), Virginia State
 Defensive tackle - Steve Williams (senior, 6'5", 262 pounds), Western Carolina
 Middle guard - Sammy Gellerstedt (senior, 5'9", 205 pounds), Tampa
 Linebacker - Harry Gooden (senior, 6'5", 220 pounds), Alcorn A&M
 Linebacker - Jim LeClair (senior, 6'3", 220 pounds), North Dakota
 Linebacker - Jim Youngblood (junior, 6'3", 235 pounds), Tennessee Tech
 Defensive back - Cliff Brooks (senior, 6'2", 203 pounds), Tennessee State
 Defensive back - Levi Johnson (junior, 6'4", 190 pounds), Texas A&I
 Defensive back - Dennis Meyer (senior, 5'11", 188 pounds), Arkansas State

Second team

Offense
 Quarterback - Joe Gilliam, Tennessee State
 Running back - Dave Bigler, Morningside
 Running back - Ole Gunderson, St. Olaf
 Running back - Calvin Harrell, Arkansas State
 End - Jeff Baker, U.S. International
 End- Rick Thone, Arkansas Tech
 Tackle - Rodney Cason, Angelo State
 Tackle - Bruce Nichols, Jacksonville State
 Guard - Gene Macken, South Dakota
 Guard - John Nuttal, Northern Arizona
 Center - Charlie Powell, McNeese State

Defense
 Defensive end - Grail Kister, Northern Colorado
 Defensive end - Ken Sanders, Howard Payne
 Defensive tackle - Clinton Brown, Hayward State
 Defensive end - Dave Pureifory, Eastern Michigan
 Middle guard - Roosevelt Manning, Northeastern Oklahoma
 Linebacker - Whitey Baun, Wittenberg
 Linebacker - Tim Kearney, Northern Michigan
 Linebacker - Greg Wright, Troy State
 Defensive back - Mike Holmes, Texas Southern
 Defensive back - Dan Martinsen, North Dakota
 Defensive back - Tom Rezzuti, Northeastern

Third team

Offense
 Quarterback - Ken Lantrip, Louisiana Tech
 Running back - Don Aleksiweicz, Hobart
 Running back - Don Heater, Montana Tech
 Running back - Charles Jessamy, Kansas Wesleyan
 End - Tom Hoffman, Idaho State
 End - Kalle Konston, RPI
 Tackle - Ron Haines, Rochester
 Tackle - Steve Okoniewski, Montana
 Guard - Fred Blackhurst, Westminster (Pennsylvania)
 Guard - Jim Osborne, Southern
 Center - Ron Sani, Santa Clara

Defense
 Defensive end - Dave Snesrud, Hamline
 Defensive end - Jim Stone, Hawaii
 Defensive tackle - Doug Cowan, Puget Sound
 Defensive tackle - Theodore Washington, Mississippi Valley
 Middle guard - Chris Richardson, Louisiana Tech
 Linebacker - Pete Contaldi, Montclair State
 Linebacker - Sam Cvijanovich, Cal Lutheran
 Linebacker - Mike Leidy, Hampden-Sydney
 Defensive back - Ron Collier, Central Missouri
 Defensive back - Saylor Fox, Newberry
 Defensive back - Bob Kroll, Northern Michigan

See also
 1971 College Football All-America Team

References

Little All-America college football team
Little All-America college football team
Little All-America college football teams